Walter Lee Barnes (January 26, 1918 – January 6, 1998) was an American football guard and actor who played in National Football League (NFL) for four seasons. He played in the (NFL) for the Philadelphia Eagles and in college at Louisiana State University.  Barnes was an actor in both American and European films. He appeared in several films with John Wayne, Lex Barker, and Clint Eastwood.

Sports career
Barnes earned his nickname of "Piggy" from catching a piglet when a boy. Playing football at Parkersburg High School, he was on the unbeaten 1938 team and played in the 1939 North-South Game.

Following military service in the United States Army in World War II as a sergeant, Barnes enrolled at Louisiana State University (LSU) where he became not only a football player but a college weightlifting champion. Following graduation he joined the Philadelphia Eagles football team as a guard before retiring and becoming a coach of football teams of Columbia University and Arizona State University.

While playing for the Eagles, Barnes made time to help his alma mater, LSU, by spying on the practices of the Oklahoma Sooners team prior to the 1950 Sugar Bowl.  After being caught by members of the Oklahoma football staff and Biloxi, Mississippi residents, Barnes fled to hide in the house of a former LSU teammate, Elbert Manuel.  Both Barnes and Manuel refused Oklahoma coach Bud Wilkinson's offer to present themselves for identification to clear their names.  The spying incident had little to do with the outcome of the game, as Oklahoma beat LSU easily, 35–0.

Barnes was inducted into the Coaches' Association Hall in June 2010.

Acting career

Barnes entered acting after appearing several times on The Eagles Nest, a local Philadelphia television show. WCAU television placed him on several local shows.  His contacts with Walt Silver, a producer for Warner Bros. Television, led him into several appearances on television and films. Some of his more notable appearances included Bronco, Gunsmoke, Cheyenne, Bonanza, Have Gun – Will Travel and Death Valley Days. John Wayne got him a small role as Charlie the Bartender in Rio Bravo.

Tiring of small roles and seeing opportunities overseas, Barnes was one of the many American actors who moved to Italy in the early 1960s. Kirk Douglas recommended him for a role in his The Vikings television spinoff Tales of the Vikings that was filmed for Douglas's production company in Germany.  From 1960 to 1969, he was first active in pirate movies, then Karl May film adaptations and Spaghetti Westerns.

Barnes returned to the United States in 1969 and appeared in more films and television series, which included The High Chaparral. His friendship with Clint Eastwood on Rawhide later led him to several roles in Eastwood's films.  He retired from acting in 1987 and became increasingly ill due to his diabetes.  Barnes died on January 6, 1998. He was the father of German former actress Lara Wendel, who was born Daniela Barnes.

Other acting appearances

 1957 Oregon Passage - film as Sergeant Jed Erschick
 1957 Cheyenne - TV series as Chris Barlow
 1958 Revolt in the Big House - film as Guard Captain Starkey
 1958 Death Valley Days - TV as Blacksmith Gil Calvin
 1959 Bat Masterson - TV as Mr. Paulson
 1959 Westbound - film as Willis, Stage Depot Cook
 1959 Rio Bravo - film as Charlie (uncredited)
 1960 Under Ten Flags - film as Unknown
 1960 Il carro armato dell'8 settembre - film as Unknown
 1960 Robin Hood and the Pirates - film as Guercio / Orbo
 1961 The Secret of the Black Falcon - film as Jack 'Calico Jack'
 1961 El secreto de los hombres azules - film as Matthias
 1961 Romulus and the Sabines - film as Stilicone
 1961 Queen of the Seas - film as Captain Poof
 1961 Revenge of the Conquered - film as Unknown
 1962 Avenger of the Seven Seas  - film as Van Artz
 1963 Il segno di Zorro - film as Mario
 1963 Captain Sindbad - film as Rolf
 1963 Slave Girls of Sheba - film as Unknown
 1963 Apache Gold as Bill Jones
 1964 Revenge of the Musketeers as Porthos
 1964 Among Vultures - film as Martin Bauman Sr.
 1965 Challenge of the Gladiator - film as Terenzo
 1965 The Oil Prince - film as Bill Campbell
 1965 Duel at Sundown - film as 'Old' McGow
 1966 Winnetou and the Crossbreed - film as Mac Haller
 1966 The Big Gundown - film as Brokston
 1967 Clint the Stranger - film as Walter Shannon
 1967 Feuer frei auf Frankie - film as Colonel O'Connor
 1967 Love Nights in the Taiga - film as Jurij
 1967 Halleluja for Django - film as Jarret / Clay Thomas
 1968 The Long Day of Inspector Blomfield - film as Inspector Fred Lancaster
 1968 Garter Colt - film as General
 1968 The Moment to Kill - film as 'Bull'
 1968 The Magnificent Tony Carrera - film as Barnes
 1969 Colpo di stato - film as Unknown
 1969–1971 Bonanza - TV as Sheriff Truslow / Weatherby / Emmett J. Whitney / Will Griner
 1970 The Traveling Executioner - film as Sheriff
 1971 The Christian Licorice Store - film as P.C. Stayne
 1972 Daddy's Deadly Darling - film as Doctor
 1972–1973 Mission: Impossible - TV as Homer Chill / Al
 1973 High Plains Drifter - film as Sheriff Sam Shaw
 1973 Cahill U.S. Marshal - film as Sheriff Grady
 1975 Escape to Witch Mountain - film as Sheriff Purdy
 1975 Mackintosh and T.J. as Jim Webster
 1977 Emergency! - TV as Mike Gold
 1977 Day of the Animals - film as Ranger Tucker
 1977 Another Man, Another Chance - film as Foster
 1977 Pete's Dragon - film as Captain
 1978 Every Which Way but Loose - film as 'Tank' Murdock
 1980 The Dukes of Hazzard - TV as Jeb McCobb
 1980 Bronco Billy - film as Sheriff Dix
 1981 Walking Tall - TV as Carl Pusser
 1981 Smokey Bites the Dust - film as Sheriff Turner
 1982 Father Murphy - TV as Unknown
 1985 North and South - TV miniseries as Benny Haven
 1986 Stingray - TV as Daniel Coleman
 1987 Boon - TV as JCB Driver (final appearance)

References

External links

 
 

1918 births
1998 deaths
20th-century American male actors
American expatriates in Italy
American football guards
American male film actors
American male television actors
American male weightlifters
United States Army personnel of World War II
Arizona State Sun Devils football coaches
Burials at Los Angeles National Cemetery
Columbia Lions football coaches
Deaths from diabetes
Eastern Conference Pro Bowl players
Male Spaghetti Western actors
Male Western (genre) film actors
LSU Tigers football players
Military personnel from West Virginia
Parkersburg High School alumni
Philadelphia Eagles players
Sportspeople from Parkersburg, West Virginia
Third Air Force Gremlins football players
United States Army soldiers
Players of American football from West Virginia
20th-century American people